South Saddle Mountain is the tallest mountain in Washington County, Oregon, United States.
Part of the Oregon Coast Range, the peak is located in the Tillamook State Forest in the northwest section of the state of Oregon. It is the eighth-highest peak of the Oregon Coast Range.

History 

South Saddle Mountain is one of 17 peaks in Oregon with the name Saddle. South Saddle was originally known as simply Saddle Mountain but in 1983 officially became South Saddle Mountain to avoid confusion with Saddle Mountain  to the north in Clatsop County.

Geology 

Origins of the mountain begin in around 40 million years ago during the Eocene age when sandstone and siltstone formed in the region consisting of parts of the Northern Oregon Coast Range. Igneous rocks and basalt flows combined with basaltic sandstone to create much of the formations. Other sedimentary rock in the area formed more recently, around 20 million years ago. It is hypothesized that the region was an island during the Eocene era.

Area and access 

The lower peak houses a microwave transmission tower, while the lower parts of the mountain are popular for bird watchers and off-road motorcycle enthusiasts.
This  tower includes amateur radio repeaters
and an AT&T microwave transmitter.
Surrounding the mountain are forests of western hemlock and Douglas fir trees. Fauna in the area include a variety of birds such as hermit warbler, sooty grouse, chestnut-backed chickadee, golden-crowned kinglet, Steller's jay, and Pacific-slope flycatcher.

South Saddle Mountain is approximately  due northwest of Henry Hagg Lake and due west of Forest Grove. From mile post 33 on Oregon Route 6 near Lees Camp, access is via Saddlemountain Road. Nine miles from Highway 6 is a gate, the summit is then 0.5 miles from that point. The lower peak containing the radio tower is in Tillamook County.

See also 

 Wilson River

References

External links 

 

Mountains of the Oregon Coast Range
Landforms of Washington County, Oregon